Vikentije Jovanović (1689 – 6 June 1737) was the Serbian Orthodox Metropolitan of Belgrade and Karlovci from 1731 to 1737, as Vikentije II. During his diplomatic mission in Vienna in 1734, he was given permission by Emperor Charles VI to establish a hussar regiment constituted solely of Serbs and Croats. It was officially named Illyrian-Rascian regiment and inaugurated on 16 June 1735 in a grand ceremony officiated by Vikentije. The ceremony took place outside Budim where the banners which were used symbolized his importance in the Austrian Empire, but also the dual symbolism of East and West; dual coats of arms on their spears, two languages in their inscriptions (Church Slavonic and Latin), and the use of Eastern iconography and Western emblematic imagery. Vikentije's hussars went on to fight in the Austro-Russian–Turkish War (1735-1739).

Annotations

See also
 Metropolitanate of Karlovci
 List of heads of the Serbian Orthodox Church

References

Sources

 

1698 births
1737 deaths
18th-century Eastern Orthodox bishops
18th-century Serbian people
Metropolitans of Belgrade
Metropolitans of Karlovci
Serbian military leaders
People of the Habsburg monarchy
People from Szentendre
Vojvodina under Habsburg rule
Hussars
Serbs of Hungary
Habsburg Serbs